

Universities

Current universities

History since the dissolution of the University of Paris (1970) 

The universités in Paris are the direct or indirect successors of the University of Paris, divided in 1970.

Collegiate universities 
There are four collegiate universities (Établissement public à caractère scientifique, culturel et professionnel expérimental, or EPSCPE) in the Paris region:

Groups and alliances of universities and higher education institutions 

There are five groups of universities and higher education institutions in the Paris region - three of them are COMUEs and two of them are alliances:

Some groups have been terminated, such as Paris Universitas, Paris Centre Universités or UniverSud Paris, and some other are still in discussion.

Private universities 

 Catholic University of Paris
 Catholic University of Lille in Issy-lès-Moulineaux

Foreign universities
American University of Paris
University of London Institute in Paris

References
L'Étudiant – Fusion, association, communauté : la nouvelle carte de France des universités

Paris
Buildings and structures in Paris
universities